Ridley Detamore Jacobs (born 26 November 1967) is a former Antiguan cricketer, who played as a left-handed wicketkeeper batsman for the West Indian cricket team in the late 1990s and early 2000s. He was the first opening batsman 
to carry his bat in the history of Cricket World Cup and was the fourth batsman to do so in a One Day International. Jacobs also picked up 219 dismissals in tests along with 189 in ODIs, which is second only to Jeff Dujon, for the Windies in his international career.

International career
He made his Test match debut in 1998 on his 31st birthday, playing in 65 Tests in six years. In this time he took over 200 catches behind the stumps, making him only the second West Indies keeper to achieve the feat (after Jeff Dujon). He also played 147 ODIs. However, he was gradually pushed out of the team during 2004 and 2005, with Courtney Browne and Carlton Baugh, Jr. challenging for his position.

He is widely known for playing a valuable knock as opener scoring unbeaten 49 off 142 balls against Australia at the 1999 Cricket World Cup and became the first ever batsman to carry his bat in a World Cup match, 20 years later at the 2019 Cricket World Cup Sri Lankan captain Dimuth Karunaratne joined him in the elite list of carrying the bat in Cricket World Cups.

Jacobs also jointly holds the world record for taking seven catches in a Test innings, which he achieved against Australia in Melbourne in 2000. He shares the feat with Wasim Bari, Bob Taylor and Ian Smith. Jacobs became the first West Indian to score a century for the West Indies against South Africa in the 2001 test series. He later was named as the stand in captain, in place of Carl Hooper, for the Windies' 2002-03 tour of Bangladesh. He led the Windies to a 2-0 win in the ODI series and a 2-0 sweep of the test series upon the tour. During 2004 Jacobs featured in a record breaking partnership, where he scored an unbeaten century and Brian Lara 400 not out, in the fourth test against England at the Antigua Recreation Ground, St. John's, Antigua.

References

1967 births
Living people
Antigua and Barbuda cricketers
Leeward Islands cricketers
West Indies Test cricketers
West Indies One Day International cricketers
West Indies Test cricket captains
Commonwealth Games competitors for Antigua and Barbuda
Cricketers at the 1998 Commonwealth Games
People from Saint Paul Parish, Antigua
Cricketers at the 1999 Cricket World Cup
Cricketers at the 2003 Cricket World Cup
Wicket-keepers